Solomon Temple is a  summit located in the Grand Canyon, in Coconino County of northern Arizona, USA. It is situated four miles north of Moran Point, 3.5 miles east of Newberry Butte, and 1.5 mile southeast of Rama Shrine, its nearest higher neighbor.

Solomon Temple was named after historical king Solomon by geologist François E. Matthes, following Clarence Dutton's practice of naming geographical features in the Grand Canyon after mythological deities and heroic figures. This feature's name was officially adopted in 1906 by the U.S. Board on Geographic Names.

Solomon Temple is a butte composed of Mississippian Redwall Limestone, which overlays shale of the Cambrian Tonto Group. The Solomon Temple Member of the Dox Formation is so named because of exposures 2.4 kilometers northeast of this butte.

According to the Köppen climate classification system, Solomon Temple is located in a Cold semi-arid climate zone.

See also
 Geology of the Grand Canyon area

Gallery

References

External links 

 Weather forecast: National Weather Service
 Solomon Temple photo: Flickr
 Solomon Temple photo by Harvey Butchart
 Summit photo by Harvey Butchart

Grand Canyon
Landforms of Coconino County, Arizona
Buttes of Arizona
Colorado Plateau
Grand Canyon National Park
North American 1000 m summits